Khahotepre Sobekhotep VI (also known as Sobekhotep V) was an Egyptian king of the 13th Dynasty during the Second Intermediate Period.

According to Egyptologist Kim Ryholt he was the thirty-first pharaoh of the dynasty, while Darrell Baker believes instead that he was its thirtieth ruler. Alternatively, Jürgen von Beckerath and Detlef Franke see him as the twenty-fifth king of the dynasty.

Identity
Until Ryholt's study of the Second Intermediate Period, it was believed that Sobekhotep VI's prenomen was Merhotepre. Reevaluating the archeological evidence, however, Ryholt attributed Merhotepre to Sobekhotep V and Khahotepre to Sobekhotep VI. Because of this change of prenomen, Merhotepre Sobekhotep and Khahotepre Sobekhotep are respectively called Sobekhotep VI and Sobekhotep V in older studies.

Attestations
Khahotepre Sobekhotep VI is listed in the Turin canon as the successor of Sobekhotep IV. However, this only occurs because one line is missing within a lacuna in the king list, below the line for Sobekhotep IV. This lacuna would have preserved the reign of Merhotepre Sobekhotep. Khahotepre Sobekhotep VI is credited a reign of 4 years, 8 months and 29 days, which Ryholt dates to 1719-1715 BC. In spite of this relatively long reign for the period, there are only very few objects directly attesting Sobekhotep VI. There exists a scarab seal from Abydos and a kneeling statuette of the king, possibly from Kerma. Items of unknown provenance include 6 scarab seals, a cylinder seal and a seal impression. Finally, a scarab bearing the prenomen Khahotepre was found in a tomb in Jericho, which could be evidence of trade relations between the 13th dynasty state and the Levant.

Family
Khahotepre Sobekhotep VI's father was perhaps Sobekhotep IV, the best attested king of the entire second intermediate period. This hypothesis is based on an inscription found in the Wadi el-Hudi which attests that Sobekhotep IV had a son called 'Sobekhotep'. If this son is indeed Sobekhotep VI, then his mother would be possibly Tjan, wife of Sobekhotep IV. Sobekhotep VI's queen may have been named Khaenoub (also Khaesnebou) or Nubhotepti.

References

External links

 Sobekhotep VI from Digital Egypt (University College. London)

18th-century BC Pharaohs
Pharaohs of the Thirteenth Dynasty of Egypt